Ultra-Obscene is the debut studio album by Breakbeat Era, a collaborative project consisting of Roni Size, DJ Die, and Leonie Laws. It was originally released on XL Recordings in 1999. It peaked at number 31 on the UK Albums Chart.

Critical reception
Rick Anderson of AllMusic says, "Leonie Laws is not a tuneless singer, by any means, but her approach is more punk than pop, and the instrumental accompaniment is straight out of the 'darkcore' subgenre of drum'n'bass, a style typified by minor chords and creepy, robotic basslines." Laurence Phelan of The Independent called it "the first successful vocal d'n'b album."

Track listing

Personnel
Credits adapted from liner notes.
 Roni Size – production, mixing
 DJ Die – production, mixing
 Leonie Laws – vocals
 Roger Beaujolais – vibraphone (3, 15)
 Rob Chant – guitar (3)
 Jeff Rose – guitar (4, 12, 13)
 Adrian Utley – guitar (7)
 Richard Glover – bass guitar (4, 13)
 Toby Pascoe – drums (8)
 Max Sedgeley – drums (11)
 Dave Amso – engineering
 Andy Henderson – additional engineering
 Absolute – additional mixing
 Alex Jenkins – art direction, design, photography

Charts

References

External links
 
 

1999 debut albums
XL Recordings albums
Drum and bass albums